Colville High School is a public secondary school located in the city of Colville, Washington, United States. They also offer Advanced Placement (AP) classes to students.

Notable alumni
 Mike Dodson
 Yvonne Wanrow

References

External links
 Colville High School

High schools in Stevens County, Washington
Public high schools in Washington (state)